Bull Dog (1927–1954) was a French Thoroughbred racehorse who became a North American Champion sire and Champion broodmare sire.

Background
Bull Dog was by American Jefferson Davis Cohn at his Haras du Bois-Roussel in Alençon in France's Lower Normandy region, and raced for him as a homebred. Bull Dog was sired by Teddy, who had been the Leading sire in France in 1923. His dam was Plucky Liege, one of the most important broodmares of the 20th century. Bull Dog was a full brother to Sir Gallahad, who won the Poule d'Essai des Poulains and became a leading sire in North America. Plucky Liege also produced two other colts, Bois Roussel and Admiral Drake, who went on to sire classic winners in Europe. Plucky Liege was sired by Spearmint, a winner of the two most prestigious races in England and France in 1906, The Derby and the Grand Prix de Paris.

Bull Dog was trained by the highly successful Staffordshire-born trainer, Robert Denman,

Racing career
At age two Bull Dog earned a second-place finish in the important Prix Robert Papin at Maisons-Laffitte Racecourse. As a three-year-old he won the 1930 Prix Daphnis and the Prix La Flèche d'Or, but it was his performance off the racetrack for which he is best remembered.

As a sire
Bull Dog's full brother Sir Gallahad was imported to the United States and became an extremely important Champion sire and Champion broodmare sire in North America. Because of his immediate success, American E. Dale Schaffer purchased Bull Dog in late 1930 and brought him to the United States too stand at his Coldstream Stud in Lexington, Kentucky.

At stud, Bull Dog became the Leading sire in North America in 1943 and the Leading broodmare sire in North America in 1953, 1954, and 1956. Bull Dog died at Coldstream Stud in 1954 having sired horses that would win 52 stakes races. His most significant son was Bull Lea, a very influential sire for Kentucky's renowned Calumet Farm whose sons included the 1948 U.S. Triple Crown champion, Citation.

Pedigree

Note: b. = Bay, ch. = Chestnut

References

1927 racehorse births
1954 racehorse deaths
Racehorses bred in France
Racehorses trained in France
United States Champion Thoroughbred Sires
American Champion Thoroughbred broodmare sires
Thoroughbred family 16-a
Chefs-de-Race